is a former Japanese football player.

Playing career
Maeda was born in Saga Prefecture on August 29, 1975. In 1997, when he was Fukuoka University student, he joined Japan Football League club Sagan Tosu. Although he could not play at all in the match behind Riki Takasaki until 1998, the club was promoted to new league J2 League from 1999. Although he debuted in 1999, he could not play many matches until 2001. In 2002, he moved to Japan Football League club Alouette Kumamoto. However he could not play many matches and retired end of 2002 season.

Club statistics

References

External links

1975 births
Living people
Fukuoka University alumni
Association football people from Saga Prefecture
Japanese footballers
J2 League players
Japan Football League (1992–1998) players
Japan Football League players
Sagan Tosu players
Roasso Kumamoto players
Association football goalkeepers